Bynum High School is a public high school located in Bynum, Texas (USA). It is part of the Bynum Independent School District located in south central Hill County and classified as a 1A school by the UIL.  In 2015, the school was rated "Met Standard" by the Texas Education Agency.

Athletics
The Bynum Bulldogs compete in these sports - 

Volleyball, 6-Man Football, Basketball, Golf, Tennis & Track

References

External links
Bynum ISD
List of Six-man football stadiums in Texas

Schools in Hill County, Texas
Public high schools in Texas